Roberto Luis Viau (November 16, 1931 – June 6, 1971) was an Argentine basketball player, who competed at the 1952 Summer Olympics. He was a member of the basketball team which finished fourth. He played all eight games in the 1952 tournament.

References

1931 births
1971 deaths
Argentine men's basketball players
Olympic basketball players of Argentina
Basketball players at the 1951 Pan American Games
Basketball players at the 1952 Summer Olympics
Basketball players at the 1955 Pan American Games
Pan American Games silver medalists for Argentina
Burials at La Chacarita Cemetery
Pan American Games medalists in basketball
FIBA World Championship-winning players
Medalists at the 1951 Pan American Games
Medalists at the 1955 Pan American Games
1950 FIBA World Championship players